Protective factors are conditions or attributes (skills, strengths, resources, supports or coping strategies) in individuals, families, communities or the larger society that help people deal more effectively with stressful events and mitigate or eliminate risk in families and communities.

In the field of Preventive Medicine and Health Psychology, Protective Factors refer to any factor that decreases the chances of a negative health outcome occurring.  Conversely, a Risk factor will increase the chances of a negative health outcome occurring.  Just as statistical correlations and regressions can examine how a range of independent variables impact a dependent variable, we can examine how many Protective and Risk factors contribute to the likelihood of an illness occurring.

Adoption
Protective factors include:
Adoptive parents having an accurate understanding of their adopted children's pre-adoption medical and behavioral problems 
Assistance of adoption professionals in the home of adopted children 

Some risks that adopted children are prone to:
Self-mutilation
Delinquency
Trouble with the law
Substance abuse
Thievery
Early sexuality and promiscuity

See also
Epidemiology
Medical statistics
Risk factor

References

Epidemiology
Medical statistics
Risk factors